Secret History of Princess Taiping, also known as Taiping Gongzhu Mishi, is a 2012 Chinese historical television series. The protagonist is the firstborn daughter (posthumously known as Princess Andingsi, who died in infancy according to history) of Wu Zetian, the only female emperor in Chinese history. However, in this television series, the princess survived, and when she grows up she impersonates her younger sister Princess Taiping to take revenge on her mother and attempts to seize the throne for herself. Directed by Lee Hon-to and Zhou Min, the series starred three actresses — Alyssa Chia, Zheng Shuang and Lin Miaoke — as Princess Taiping, each playing the princess at a different stage of her life. It was first broadcast in mainland China on Hunan Satellite TV on 27 March 2012.

Plot
In 654, during the Tang dynasty, Wu Zetian (then a concubine of Emperor Gaozong) murdered her firstborn daughter (posthumously known as Princess Andingsi) and pushed the blame to Empress Wang. The princess's wet nurse, Zhaoniang, discovers that the baby princess is still alive and smuggles her out of the palace. Zhaoniang and the young princess escape from the capital and venture further north into the desert regions. Several years later, the princess has grown up and she develops a romantic relationship with Axiena Simu, a young Tujue prince.

At one point, Zhaoniang dies trying to protect the princess. The princess learns the truth about her origins. She decides to seek vengeance on her mother Wu Zetian, who has seized the Tang throne and currently rules as a female emperor. The princess collaborates with Axiena Simu to kidnap Princess Taiping, Wu Zetian's younger daughter. As the two princesses resemble each other in appearance, the older one impersonates her younger sister and returns to the palace, where she plots her revenge and schemes to take over her mother's place as the ruler of China.

Cast
 Alyssa Chia as Princess Taiping / Princess Andingsi (young adult)
 Zheng Shuang as Princess Taiping / Princess Andingsi (teenage)
 Lin Miaoke as Princess Taiping / Princess Andingsi (child)
Lan Yan as Empress Wang
 Sun Yaoqi as Shangguan Wan'er (young adult), Wu Zetian's secretary 
 Tu Liman as Shangguan Wan'er (middle age)
 Liu Yuxin as Wu Zetian (young adult), the mother of the two princesses
 Li Xiang as Wu Zetian (middle age)
 Xu Weilu as Wei Tuan'er, a servant of Wu Zetian
 Yu Xintian as Princess Anle
 Jiang Linjing as Empress Wei
 Grace Yu as Zhaoniang
 Zhang Han as Emperor Xuanzong
 Zhu Zi as Xue Shao
 Yuan Hong as Axiena Simu
 Gao Zi as Emperor Gaozong
 Ye Peng as Emperor Ruizong
 Tian Yu as Emperor Zhongzong
 Guo Qiming as Gao Qi
 Wu Yuhua as Li Chongjun
 Wang Hao as Wu Youji
 Ma Fei as Wu Chengsi
 Ye Xinyu as Di Renjie
 Ju Hui as Zhang Yizhi
 Yuan Jiabao as Zhang Changzong

See also
 Secret History of Empress Wu
List of Hunan Television dramas in 2012

External links
  Secret History of Princess Taiping on Sina.com

2012 Chinese television series debuts
Television series set in the Tang dynasty
Television series set in the Zhou dynasty (690–705)
Chinese historical television series
Hunan Television dramas
Television series set in the 7th century